Claire D. Cronin (born January 29, 1960) is an American attorney, politician, and diplomat who currently serves as the United States Ambassador to Ireland. She previously served as a member of the Massachusetts House of Representatives from the 11th Plymouth district from 2013-2022. Cronin was the first woman to serve as House Majority Leader.

In May 2021, President Joe Biden was reported to have selected Cronin as the United States Ambassador to Ireland. On June 23, 2021, the nomination was officially announced. On January 19, 2022, Cronin was sworn in as the United States Ambassador to Ireland in the Massachusetts House of Representatives chamber. She presented her credentials to the President of Ireland, Michael D. Higgins, on February 10, 2022.

Early life and education
Born Claire McLaughlin in Brockton, Massachusetts to Phyllis Lucey and James Daniel McLaughlin. Her father was the son of an Irish immigrant from the Inishowen Peninsula in Northern Co. Donegal and all four of Phyllis Lucey’s grandparents were Irish. Cronin graduated from Brockton High School in 1978 and attended Stonehill College in Easton and graduated with a bachelor's degree in Political Science in 1982. She went on to earn a Juris Doctor from Suffolk University Law School in 1985.

Career

Early career 
Cronin was admitted to the Massachusetts Bar Association in 1985 and is admitted to practice in the U.S. District Court and before the United States Supreme Court.

Cronin has maintained a law practice in Brockton. She was formerly a member of the Brockton Democratic City Committee, and previously served on the Easton Democratic Town Committee and Democratic State Committee.

Cronin served as mediator in the Catholic Archdiocese of Boston sex abuse scandal settlement.

Massachusetts House of Representatives
In 2012, long-time State Representative Geraldine Creedon announced her plans to retire from public office. On February 14, 2012, Cronin announced her candidacy for the newly redistricted seat. She won a four-way Democratic primary with 33% of the vote, defeating Brockton Councilors-at-Large Robert Sullivan and Jass Stewart, and Southeast Regional School Committee member Mark Linde. In the general election, Cronin defeated Republican Dan Murphy.

In the legislature, Cronin serves as the Majority Leader of the Massachusetts House of Representatives. Prior to assuming this role, Cronin served as the chair of the Joint Committee on the Judiciary. She is the first woman in the history of the Massachusetts House of Representatives to serve as chair of the House Judiciary Committee. In her role as chair, Cronin was the architect of the comprehensive House criminal justice reform bill and was the lead negotiator for the House of Representatives during the conference committee. This sweeping piece of legislation marked the most extensive reform of the state's criminal justice system in decades.

Cronin previously served as the vice-chair of the Joint Committee on the Judiciary, and as a member of the House Committee on Ways and Means, the Joint Committee on Veterans and Federal Affairs, the Joint Committee on Economic Development and Emerging Technologies, the Joint Committee on Telecommunications, Utilities and Energy, and the House Committee on Post Audit and Oversight.

Cronin announced Massachusetts' votes in the roll call at the 2020 Democratic National Convention. During the 2020 United States presidential election Cronin was a fund-raising bundler for the Joe Biden 2020 presidential campaign in the state of Massachusetts.

On January 18, 2022, Cronin resigned from the House, and thus vacated her position as Majority Leader.

U.S. Ambassador to Ireland 
In May 2021, Cronin was reported as President Joe Biden's nominee for United States Ambassador to Ireland. On June 23, 2021, President Biden announced his intent to nominate Cronin to that position. On July 13, 2021, her nomination was sent to the United States Senate. On September 29, 2021, a hearing on her nomination was held before the Senate Foreign Relations Committee. On October 19, 2021, her nomination was reported favorably out of committee. On December 18, 2021, her nomination was confirmed by the full United States Senate in a voice vote.

On January 19, 2022, she was sworn in as the United States Ambassador to Ireland during a formal session of the Massachusetts House of Representatives. She presented her credentials to the President of Ireland, Michael D. Higgins, on February 10, 2022. In her remarks at the ceremony, Cronin noted: “President Biden entrusted me as the US Ambassador to Ireland at a very important moment. As his eyes and ears here in Ireland, I plan to engage with politicians and other stakeholders. President Biden is unequivocal in his support for the Good Friday Agreement, a historic achievement that must be protected to ensure peace and stability in Northern Ireland.”

Tenure
Cronin also is raising awareness of the J-1 visa program for Irish students traveling to the US. 
“Our ancestral relations are the foundation of our ties but our trade and investment is the glue that holds us together, but so too we need to introduce young Irish citizens, young people to America,” she says.

Cronin had been scheduled to attend the in-person meeting between President of the United States Joe Biden and Taoiseach Micheál Martin at the White House on 17 March 2022, a meeting which ultimately did not occur due to Martin's own COVID diagnosis on the day. Cronin had also intended to participate in Irish-American festivities alongside Ambassador of Ireland to the United States Daniel Mulhall.

Personal life
Cronin is married to Ray Cronin, the CEO and co-founder of Club Benchmarking, a performance analytics company that assists private recreational clubs.

See also
 2019–2020 Massachusetts legislature
 2021–2022 Massachusetts legislature

References

External links

|-

1960 births
21st-century American politicians
21st-century American women politicians
Ambassadors of the United States to Ireland
American women ambassadors
Democratic Party members of the Massachusetts House of Representatives
Living people
People from Easton, Massachusetts
Politicians from Brockton, Massachusetts
Stonehill College alumni
Suffolk University Law School alumni
Women state legislators in Massachusetts